Athar an Nabi ( أثر النبي ) is a town in Egypt, about 4 miles (7 km) south of Cairo. Its name is Arabic for "Effect (or Footprints) of the Prophet", but is an altered form of Coptic ϩⲁⲑⲱⲣⲛⲟⲩⲃ (Hathornub), meaning "Golden Hathor", perhaps referring to an Ancient Egyptian cult centre formerly present there.

See also
List of Coptic place names

References

External links
Google Earth view

Towns in Egypt